EML Olev (M415) is a Frauenlob-class minelayer of the Estonian Navy Mineships Division.

Introduction
The minelayer Olev is a vessel of the Estonian Navy Mineships Division and also the third modernized Frauenlob class minelayer. In 2003, a cooperation contract was signed between the Paldiski city council and the minelayer Olev which gave the vessel a right to wear the Paldiski town coat of arms and to introduce the city in all foreign harbors across the world.

History
The Olev (M415) was built in West-Germany, in a Krögerwerft shipyard in Rendsburg. The vessel was launched on 13 December 1966, and she entered service a year later on 21 September 1967. The German Navy decommissioned Diana and two of her twin sisters Minerva and Undine in late 1990s and gave the vessels to the Estonian Navy to operate. On the ceremony the vessel received an Estonian name Olev. Olev was decommissioned in 2005 and sold in 2008. She then sat "abandoned" in Tallinn Seaplane Harbor till she was towed to Noblessner, where its superstructure got a new coat of paint. She is currently sitting in Noblessner Harbor.

See also
Baltic Naval Squadron

References

External links
Estonian Navy

Frauenlob-class minesweepers
Ships built in Rendsburg
1966 ships
Cold War minesweepers of Germany
Frauenlob-class minesweepers of the Estonian Navy
Estonian Mineships Division